Gittidas is a meadow in Kaghan Valley in Mansehra District of Khyber Pakhtunkhwa the province of Pakistan.

See also 
Dana Meadows
Kaghan Valley

References 

Landforms of Khyber Pakhtunkhwa
Meadows in Pakistan